Miers Bluff is the point forming the southwest extremity of Hurd Peninsula, the southeast side of the entrance to South Bay and the northwest side of the entrance to False Bay, on Livingston Island in the South Shetland Islands, Antarctica. The name "Elephant Point", given by Robert Fildes in 1820–22 to another feature, has been for a number of years applied in error to this bluff. It is now approved as originally intended and a new name has been substituted for the feature here described.

The point is named after John Miers, British engineer and botanist who travelled to Chile in 1818 and was responsible for the publication in 1820 of the first chart of the South Shetland Islands, based on the work of William Smith.

Location

Maps
 Isla Livingston: Península Hurd. Mapa topográfico de escala 1:25 000. Madrid: Servicio Geográfico del Ejército, 1991.
 L.L. Ivanov et al. Antarctica: Livingston Island and Greenwich Island, South Shetland Islands. Scale 1:100000 topographic map. Sofia: Antarctic Place-names Commission of Bulgaria, 2005.
 L.L. Ivanov. Antarctica: Livingston Island and Greenwich, Robert, Snow and Smith Islands. Scale 1:120000 topographic map. Troyan: Manfred Wörner Foundation, 2010.  (First edition 2009. )
 Antarctic Digital Database (ADD). Scale 1:250000 topographic map of Antarctica. Scientific Committee on Antarctic Research (SCAR). Since 1993, regularly upgraded and updated.
 L.L. Ivanov. Antarctica: Livingston Island and Smith Island. Scale 1:100000 topographic map. Manfred Wörner Foundation, 2017.

References

 Miers Bluff. SCAR Composite Antarctic Gazetteer

Headlands of Livingston Island